Alain Lorieux (born March 26, 1956) is a retired French international rugby union player. He played as a lock.

Lorieux played for FC Aix les Bains from 1978/79 to 1984/85, FC Grenoble from 1985/86 to 1988/89, and RC Seyssens in 1989/90.

Lorieux had 31 caps for France, from 1981 to 1989, scoring 3 tries, 12 points on aggregate. He earned his first cap on 5 July 1981 against Australia in a 17-15 loss at Brisbane. He played 5 times at the Five Nations Championship, in 1982, 1984, 1987, 1988 and 1989, being a winner in 1988, ex-aequo with Wales, and 1989. Lorieux was called for the 1987 Rugby World Cup, where France was runner-up to New Zealand. He played in 5 games, scoring 2 tries, 8 points on aggregate.

References

External links
 http://www.espnscrum.com/france/rugby/player/9172.html

French rugby union players
Living people
France international rugby union players
1956 births
Sportspeople from La Tronche
Rugby union locks
FC Grenoble players